The World Foundation for Medical Research and Prevention is a 501(c)(3) Houston-based grantmaking public charity established to provide leadership in developing resources to sponsor and fund the projects of Professor Luc Montagnier as well as other research aimed  at the design of new types of AIDS vaccines, prolonging the active life of aging people and the diagnosis and treatment of microbial and viral factors associated with cancers, neurodegenerative, auto-immune and other multi-factorial disease processes such as Alzheimer's disease and Parkinson's disease. The World Foundation for Medical Research and Prevention supports its work through proceeds from special events, cause-related marketing projects, and voluntary contributions from individuals, corporations, and foundations.

References

External links
  Friends Fight AIDS Official website of the World Foundation for Medical Research and Prevention

Medical and health organizations based in Texas
HIV/AIDS research organisations
Health charities in the United States